Gabriela Sabatini defeated Pam Shriver in the final, 7–5, 6–2, 6–2 to win the singles tennis title at the 1988 Virginia Slims Championships.

Steffi Graf was the defending champion, but lost in the semifinals to Shriver. Graf was attempting to achieve a Super Slam, having won all four majors (the Australian Open, French Open, Wimbledon and US Open) and the Olympics earlier in the season.

Seeds
A champion seed is indicated in bold text while text in italics indicates the round in which that seed was eliminated.

  Steffi Graf (semifinals)
  Martina Navratilova (quarterfinals)
  Chris Evert (quarterfinals)
  Gabriela Sabatini (champion)
  Pam Shriver (final)
  Natasha Zvereva (quarterfinals)
  Manuela Maleeva-Fragnière (quarterfinals)
  Helena Suková (semifinals)

Draw

 NB: The Final was the best of 5 sets while all other rounds were the best of 3 sets.

See also
WTA Tour Championships appearances

References
 1988 Virginia Slims Championships Draw

Singles 1988
Singles